There is more than one place named Youngtown:

Youngtown, Tasmania, suburb of Launceston, Tasmania, Australia
Youngtown, Arizona, town in Maricopa County, Arizona, United States
Youngtown, Alabama, populated place in Lawrence County, Alabama, United States
Youngstown (band)